Mulino is the name of several rural localities in Russia:
Mulino, Kirov Oblast, a selo in Mulinsky Rural Okrug of Nagorsky District of Kirov Oblast
Mulino, Kostroma Oblast, a village in Prigorodnoye Settlement of Nerekhtsky District of Kostroma Oblast
Mulino (settlement), Nizhny Novgorod Oblast, a settlement in Mulinsky Selsoviet of Volodarsky District of Nizhny Novgorod Oblast
Mulino (village), Nizhny Novgorod Oblast, a village in Mulinsky Selsoviet of Volodarsky District of Nizhny Novgorod Oblast
Mulino, Vologda Oblast, a village in Timanovsky Selsoviet of Babushkinsky District of Vologda Oblast
Mulino, Zabaykalsky Krai, a selo in Alexandrovo-Zavodsky District of Zabaykalsky Krai